Half a Life is a book by American author Darin Strauss.  It received the National Book Critics Circle Award for memoir in 2011. The memoir grew out of a 2008 This American Life episode entitled "Life After Death," in which the author addressed the effects of a high school traffic accident.

Summary

Strauss, a novelist, recounts how his life was profoundly altered when a car he was driving struck and killed a high school classmate. She was on a bicycle that swerved in front of his car, which struck and killed her.

Although it was determined Strauss could in no way have avoided the accident, the book details his attempts, over half his life, to come to terms with his feelings of responsibility.

Reception
Half a Life was enthusiastically received by critics here and abroad.  Writing in The Guardian, writer and critic Robert McCrum called the book "a masterpiece....'Half my life ago, I killed a girl'. You'll rarely get a better first line. What follows—Strauss's precise, honest and rigorous account of a fateful road accident and its harrowing aftermath—fulfills every hope aroused in the casual reader. What starts as an 18-year-old's carefree outing in his father's car leads to the death of Celine Zilke, a classmate, followed by a court case (this is America). Simultaneously, however, there is redemption. Crystal, and with many facets, Half a Life  deserves celebration." In the Chicago Tribune, critic Elizabeth Taylor called it "a book that inspires admiration, sentence by sentence...This is memoir in its finest form." Writer Dani Shapiro, in The New York Times Book Review, found the memoir "elegant, painful, stunningly honest." She continued, "At the center of this memoir thrums a question fundamental to what it means to be human: What do we do with what we’ve been given?" A critical favorite in the UK, Half a Life was called "one of the best books I have ever read" by Ali Catterall on The BBC, as well as "precise, elegantly written, fresh, wise, and very sad ... indicative not only of a very talented writer, but of a proper human being” by Nick Hornby

Half a Life was widely excerpted in venues such as GQ, This American Life, United Kingdom papers The Times and Daily Mail.

Awards
Half a Life received the 2011 National Book Critics Circle Award for autobiography.

References

External links
 Book page on McSweeny's
 Dani Shapiro on Half a Life in The New York Times Book Review
 Strauss with Sam Tanenhaus of The New York Times Book Review
 Strauss and "Guilty as Not Charged" on This American Life
 Poets & Writers on Darin Strauss and Half a Life

American memoirs
2011 non-fiction books
National Book Critics Circle Award-winning works
McSweeney's books